A Lover in Pawn is a 1920 Swedish silent drama film directed by Victor Sjöström.

The film was premiered on 11 October and was shot in the Råsunda Film City with exteriors from Öregrund, Vallentuna and Gävle by J. Julius. The film was provided with hand-texted texts and drawn vignettes, executed by the artist Arthur Sjögren.

Cast
 Victor Sjöström as Sammel Eneman
 Concordia Selander as Mutter Boman
 Greta Almroth as Tora
 Harald Schwenzen as Knut
 Tor Weijden as Sailor
 Torsten Hillberg as Sailor
 Olof Ås as Sailor
 Simon Lindstrand as Innkeeper
 William Larsson as Shipmaster
 Emmy Albiin as Poor Woman

References

External links

1920 films
1920s Swedish-language films
Swedish black-and-white films
1920 drama films
Swedish silent feature films
Films directed by Victor Sjöström
Swedish drama films
Silent drama films
1920s Swedish films